Oh Jae-won (born February 9, 1985) is a retired South Korean professional baseball infielder who spent his entire career with the Doosan Bears of the KBO League. He graduated from Yatap High School and was selected by the Doosan Bears in a 2003 draft, but did not join the Bears and went to college. After graduating from college, he joined the team in 2007.

References

External links
Career statistics and player information from the KBO League

1985 births
Living people
Baseball players from Seoul
Doosan Bears players
KBO League infielders
South Korean baseball players
Kyung Hee University alumni
Asian Games medalists in baseball
Baseball players at the 2014 Asian Games
2015 WBSC Premier12 players
2017 World Baseball Classic players
Medalists at the 2014 Asian Games
Asian Games gold medalists for South Korea